is a series of video games developed and published by Capcom, and a bigger media franchise based on it, including four anime shows, an anime movie, a live action show, a magazine series, a trading card game, and numerous drama CDs, light novels, manga, and stage plays. Its story is loosely based on real events of the titular Sengoku period in the history of feudal Japan. Sengoku Basara is considered to be popular in Japan with the franchise getting good reviews and sales, winning some awards, becoming a cultural phenomenon, having the video games being cited as an example of games as art, and gaining a passionate fanbase.

While Sengoku Basara remains popular in Japan, it has gained some popularity in other Asian countries such as Indonesia, Malaysia, Singapore, South Korea, and Taiwan. Despite Sengoku Basara being considered niche outside of Asia, it does maintain a small following in countries such as Australia, Brazil, France, Germany, Italy, Russia, the United Kingdom, and the United States. The franchise started with the first Sengoku Basara video game releasing in Japan on July 21, 2005, for the PlayStation 2.

Sengoku Basaras producer is Hiroyuki Kobayashi (who has been the producer for every console and handheld game in the series except for Sengoku Basara Sanada Yukimura-den, and is the creator of the franchise), and its director is Makoto Yamamoto (who has been the director for every console and handheld game in the series except for Sengoku Basara Sanada Yukimura-den). Sengoku Basara serves as one of Capcom's flagship series in Japan. As of December 31, 2022, the game series has sold 4.1 million copies worldwide.

Games

Console and handheld games

Sengoku Basara (Devil Kings)

Sengoku Basara (戦国BASARA) is the first game in the series and released in Japan on July 21, 2005, for the PlayStation 2 (PS2) as a hack and slash, action game. Devil Kings, an English-language version of the game, featured altered gameplay and a completely different, supposedly more western audience-oriented dark fantasy story with original characters. It was never used again due to the negative response the localization received from fans, critics, and players.

Sengoku Basara 2
Sengoku Basara 2 (戦国BASARA2) is a sequel to the original Sengoku Basara, and it released in Japan for the PS2 on July 27, 2006. The game was ported to the Wii in 2007 as part of the Sengoku Basara 2 Heroes: Double Pack. An expansion titled, Sengoku Basara 2 Heroes, was released in 2007. The game marks the series' first anniversary and is also considered to have started the "Sengoku Boom" throughout Japan. The Sengoku Boom sparked a renewed interest in the history of Japan (mostly the Sengoku period of feudal Japan, hence the name) where people in Japan go to museums, castles, and battlefields to learn about their favorite Sengoku Basara character's/characters' real life history, buy merchandise related to the game series and the Sengoku period, and buy video games involving the Sengoku period (mostly Sengoku Basara).

Sengoku Basara 2 Heroes
Sengoku BASARA 2 Heroes (戦国BASARA2 英雄外伝) is an expansion to Sengoku Basara 2, and is the first expansion in the series. The game was released in Asia for the PS2 and Wii (Japan only) on November 29, 2007. The Wii version includes Sengoku Basara 2 as part of the Sengoku Basara 2 Heroes: Double Pack. Characters that were unplayable in the previous game, Sengoku Basara 2, are playable in Sengoku Basara 2 Heroes. The game sparked a major boom in tourism to the hometown of Katakura Kojūrō, Shiroishi City.

Sengoku Basara X 

Sengoku Basara X (戦国BASARA X) is a 2D fighting game developed by both Capcom, and Arc System Works, creators of the Guilty Gear and BlazBlue series, which released in Japan on April 9, 2008, for Japanese arcades, and ported to the PS2 later the same year in Asia on June 26, 2008.

Sengoku Basara Battle Heroes
Sengoku Basara Battle Heroes (戦国BASARA バトルヒーローズ) is a PSP-exclusive title released in Japan on April 9, 2009, as a beat 'em up, action game. The game is a spin-off of the series.

Sengoku Basara 3 (Sengoku Basara: Samurai Heroes)

Sengoku Basara 3 (戦国BASARA3) is the third game in the main series and sequel to Sengoku Basara 2, released in Asia on July 29, 2010, for the PlayStation 3 and Wii (Japan only). It is the first game in the series to be localized outside of Asia since the original game, and was released in North America on October 12, 2010, in Australia on October 14, 2010, and in Europe on October 15, 2010. An expansion titled, Sengoku Basara 3 Utage, was released in 2011. The game marks the series' fifth anniversary. The game currently ranks as the best-selling Sengoku Basara game in the series (before this game, it was originally Sengoku Basara 2 Heroes).

Sengoku Basara Chronicle Heroes

Sengoku Basara Chronicle Heroes (戦国BASARA クロニクルヒーローズ) released for the PSP in Japan on July 21, 2011. The game serves as a sequel to Sengoku Basara Battle Heroes.

Sengoku Basara 3 Utage
Sengoku Basara 3 Utage (戦国BASARA3 宴) released for the PS3 and Wii (Japan only) in Asia on November 10, 2011. The game serves as an expansion to Sengoku Basara 3. Characters that were unplayable in the previous game, Sengoku Basara Samurai Heroes, are playable in Sengoku Basara 3 Utage. "Utage" is Japanese for "Party".

Sengoku Basara HD Collection
Sengoku Basara HD Collection (戦国BASARA HDコレクション) released for the PS3 in Asia on August 30, 2012. It comes with Sengoku Basara, Sengoku Basara 2, and Sengoku Basara 2 Heroes in 720p HD.

Sengoku Basara 4

Sengoku Basara 4 (戦国BASARA4) is the fourth game in the main series. It was released in Asia on January 23, 2014 for the PS3. The game serves as a mixture of a sequel to Sengoku Basara 3, and a soft reboot of the series to so new fans can enjoy it without them having to play previous games to understand the full story. It's also the first console game in the series to receive a collector's edition, digital release, DLC, updates, and other online features, with every other game afterward following up with this. An expanded version, titled Sengoku Basara 4 Sumeragi, was released in 2015.

Sengoku Basara 4 Sumeragi
Sengoku Basara 4 Sumeragi (戦国BASARA4 皇) released for the PlayStation 3 and PlayStation 4 in Asia on July 23, 2015. The game is the first Sengoku Basara game to be developed for the PS4, and is also the first game to be developed by Capcom for the PS4. The game comes with all of the content in Sengoku Basara 4 along with new content. The game marks the series' tenth anniversary. Characters that were unplayable in the previous game, Sengoku Basara 4, are playable in Sengoku Basara 4 Sumeragi. "Sumeragi" is Japanese for "Emperor".

Sengoku Basara Sanada Yukimura-den
Sengoku Basara Sanada Yukimura-den (戦国BASARA 真田幸村伝) is a spin-off game focusing on the life of one of the series' main protagonists, Sanada Yukimura, released in Asia for the PS3 (Japan only) and PS4 on August 25, 2016. The game is more historically accurate than previous games. This is the first and only console game in the series to not have Hiroyuki Kobayashi and Makoto Yamamoto involved. The game currently ranks as the worst-selling Sengoku Basara game in the series (before this game, it was originally Sengoku Basara X). "Sanada Yukimura-den" is Japanese for "The Legend of Sanada Yukimura".

Mobile games

Sengoku Basara Mobile
Sengoku Basara Mobile (戦国BASARA MOBILE) was a free-to-play, mobile-based social game for mobile phones based on the Sengoku Basara franchise, and was available through Mobage. The game was announced by Capcom on April 27, 2011, and released in Japan on June 3, 2011, but was shut down on December 7, 2011. The game received "mixed or average" reviews in Japan, and was shut down due to the mixed reception and low amount of downloads. Sengoku Basara Mobile is the first mobile game in the series.

Sengoku Basara Card Heroes
Sengoku Basara Card Heroes (戦国BASARA カードヒーローズ) was a free-to-play, mobile-based card RPG for iOS and Android based on the Sengoku Basara franchise, and was available through Mobage. The game was announced by Capcom on April 25, 2012, and released in Japan on May 29, 2012, but was shut down on June 23, 2014. The game received "generally favorable" reviews in Japan, and was shut down due to Capcom wanting to put more focus on DLC and updates for Sengoku Basara 4 and because the average player count of Card Heroes decreased after Sengoku Basara 4s release. They would later change the name to Sengoku Basara Card Heroes: Matsuri (戦国BASARA カードヒーローズ・祭) on January 29, 2013. "Matsuri" is Japanese for "Festival".

Sengoku Basara Battle Party
Sengoku Basara Battle Party (戦国BASARA バトルパーティー) was a free-to-play, mobile-based gacha RPG for iOS and Android based on the Sengoku Basara franchise, and was available through Google Play and the App Store. The game was announced by Capcom on May 14, 2019, and was released in Japan on June 24, 2019. Two trailers for the game were uploaded on YouTube by Capcom on 5/15/2019, and 7/1/2019, respectively. A series of live streams done on the game by Capcom were uploaded on YouTube on 7/6/2019, 8/29/2019, 9/26/2019, 11/13/2019, 12/23/2019, 1/30/2020, and 6/24/2020, respectively. A collaboration in the game between Sengoku Basara and Monster Hunter titled, "Sengoku Basara Battle Party X Monster Hunter: World -Collaboration-", started on November 28, 2019, and ended on December 26, 2019. A trailer for the Monster Hunter collaboration was uploaded on YouTube by Capcom on November 28, 2019. Another collaboration was done in the game between Sengoku Basara and Devil May Cry titled, "Sengoku Basara Battle Party X Devil May Cry 4 -Collaboration-", with it starting on January 14, 2020, and ending on February 13, 2020, and a trailer for the Devil May Cry collaboration was uploaded on YouTube by Capcom on January 14, 2020. The game received "generally favorable" reviews in Japan. Download for the game is available but the game can't be played. The game was shut down on December 21, 2020, due to "external issues" from Capcom's management.

Adaptations
The Sengoku Basara franchise has had several different forms of media.

Notably, an anime series was planned and written by Yasuyuki Muto. The first anime, Sengoku Basara, started broadcasting in Japan on April 2, 2009. The series' sequel anime, titled Sengoku Basara II, began broadcast in Japan on July 11, 2010. Furthermore, the series' movie finale titled Sengoku Basara -The Last Party- was released in Japanese theaters on June 4, 2011. All three anime adaptations were licensed and published in the United States in 2012 by Funimation under the titles, Sengoku Basara: Samurai Kings, Sengoku Basara: Samurai Kings 2, and Sengoku Basara: Samurai Kings -The Last Party-. An anime based on Sengoku Basara 3 titled, Sengoku Basara Judge End, began broadcast in Japan on July 6, 2014, and was licensed and published in the United States in 2016 by Funimation under the title, Sengoku Basara: End of Judgement. Another anime titled, Gakuen Basara, based on the Gakuen Basara manga series, started broadcasting in Japan on October 4, 2018.

Several manga adaptations of the series have been serialized in manga magazines, and later released in tankōbon format in Japan. A manga adaptation of the second game was created by Yak Haibara. The four volume series, Sengoku Basara 2, was published in Japan from 2007-2009. It was published in the United States from 2012-2013 by UDON under the title Sengoku Basara: Samurai Legends. The title change was due to the Sengoku Basara 2 video game not being released in the United States. Kairi Shimotsuki created the first manga adaptation of the series, based on the first game, which was titled, Sengoku Basara Ranse Ranbu, and was released as a three volume series in 2006.

Radio shows have been produced with the first series being released on four CD volumes. A stage play based on Sengoku Basara 3 was announced on July 17, 2011 in Japan and ran later in 2011 from October 14 to October 30, and was later released on DVD in Japan on February 23, 2012. The stage play received "universal acclaim" in Japan. This stage play is considered to be the beginning of the Sengoku Basara stage play series' huge success and popularity in Japan with later stage plays in the series becoming even more successful and popular. There has been a total of 17 stage plays in the series as of 2019, with Capcom doing 1-2 per year (1 in 2009, 1 in 2010, 1 in 2011, 2 in 2012, 2 in 2013, 2 in 2014, 1 in 2015, 2 in 2016, 2 in 2017, 2 in 2018, and 1 in 2019).

In 2012, the Takarazuka Revue announced that Flower Troupe would be performing a 'Sengoku Basara' musical. Ranju Tomu and Ranno Hana starred, and Asumi Rio and Nozomi Futo also featured in the adaptation, which played at the Tokyu Theater Orb, from 06/15 - 07/01 in 2013. The staging of the musical was much more lavish than that of the stage plays with a lot more special effects, and less action and stunts. Reviews were "generally favorable". As of 2019, this is the first and only Sengoku Basara musical to have been performed.

A live-action television drama titled Sengoku Basara Moonlight Party began broadcasting in Japan on July 12, 2012, on the Mainichi Broadcasting System.

In August 2015, Capcom produced a collaborative stage play with Sengoku Basara and Devil May Cry titled "Sengoku Basara VS Devil May Cry". In the play, Dante, Lady, Trish, and Vergil come across some mysterious historical ruins while chasing after a demon, and are sent back in time to Japan's Warring States (Sengoku) period. There, the group meets Date Masamune, Sanada Yukimura, and other characters from the Sengoku Basara franchise. The play ran at the AiiA 2.5 Theater Tokyo for 18 performances from August 20–30. Masanari Ujigawa directed and composed the stage play with Hideaki Itsuno and Izaki Matsuno collaborating on the scenario. Kazushi Miyakoda and Tetsuya Yamaura produced the play with Hiroyuki Kobayashi and Makoto Yamamoto as supervisors.

Related products
A large range of merchandise has been created for the series in Japan, including books, CD soundtracks, drama CDs, radio CDs, trading cards, and figures.

Sengoku Basara was included as cards in Capcom's free-to-play digital collectible card game, Teppen, on October 1, 2020, worldwide through an expansion titled, "The Tale of Amatsu no Kuni". Sengoku Basara character Oichi was included as a playable hero along with more Sengoku Basara cards in another expansion for Teppen that released worldwide on January 5, 2021. The expansion is titled, "The Battle of Amatsu no Kuni."

References

External links

 
Official Sengoku BASARA 3 Stage Play website

 
Capcom franchises
Video games adapted into television shows
Video game franchises
Video games about samurai
Video games set in feudal Japan

ko:전국 바사라
ja:戦国BASARA
zh:戰國BASARA